The Electric Joe Satriani: An Anthology is an album by the guitarist Joe Satriani, released in 2003. On two CDs, it consists of a collection of the best of Satriani's electric guitar tracks remastered. It also contains the songs "Slick" and "The Eight Steps", which were previously only available in Japan. It was released exactly the same day as the release of his former student Steve Vai's compilation album The Infinite Steve Vai: An Anthology.

Track listing
All songs written by Joe Satriani.

Disc one
 "Surfing with the Alien" – 4:25
 "Satch Boogie" – 3:14
 "Always with Me, Always with You" – 3:23
 "Crushing Day" – 5:15
 "Flying in a Blue Dream" – 5:24
 "The Mystical Potato Head Groove Thing" – 5:11
 "I Believe" – 5:52
 "Big Bad Moon" – 5:16
 "Friends" – 3:30
 "The Extremist" – 3:44
 "Summer Song" – 4:59
 "Why" – 4:46
 "Time Machine" – 5:08
 "Cool #9" – 6:01
 "Down, Down, Down" – 6:10

Disc two
 "The Crush of Love" – 4:21
 "Ceremony" – 4:53
 "Crystal Planet" – 4:36
 "Raspberry Jam Delta-V" – 5:22
 "Love Thing" – 3:51
 "Borg Sex" – 5:28
 "Until We Say Goodbye" – 4:33
 "Devil's Slide" – 5:11
 "Clouds Race Across the Sky" – 6:14
 "Starry Night" – 3:55
 "Mind Storm" – 4:12
 "Slick" – 3:43
 "The Eight Steps" – 5:46
 "Not of This Earth" – 3:59
 "Rubina" – 5:51

References

Joe Satriani compilation albums
2003 compilation albums
Epic Records compilation albums